Poundra is a Dalit community from West Bengal. They are called Purno in North Bengal, Pod and Padmaraja in South Bengal, and Baleya in Medinipur and Baleshwar. They  find the name Pod offensive. Their population was around two and a half million in 2011.  As per census of India 2001, their overall literacy rate was 72 % -  male 83% and female 59%.  Their main subcastes are or used to be, the Chasi Poundra, the Mecho Poundra, the Tanti Poundra and the Dhamna Poundra. The differentiation between seems to have its origin in the occupations. They are divided in a number of gotras.

History

Medieval Bengal 
No mention is found in the Bṛhaddharma Upapuraṇa (c. 13th century), which remains the earliest document to chronicle a hierarchy of castes in Bengal. The Brahma Vaivarta Purana, notable for a very late Bengali recension c. 14/15th century, notes "Paundrakas" to be the son of a Vaisya father and Sundini mother but it is unknown if the groups are connected. Mentions remain scarce in medieval vernacular literature.

Colonial Bengal 
In his 1891 survey of castes, Herbert Hope Risley documented the Pods to be a branch of Chandala. Akin to Bagdi in the social hierarchy, they faced untouchability from Brahmins as well as Navasakhas. A majority were peasants though some had become traders, and even zamindars.

In late nineteenth century, two influential members of Pod community —Benimadhab Halder and Srimanta Naskar— produced multiple tracts of caste-history, in sync with their times. Arguing a descent from the "Poundras" —mentioned across a spectrum of Hindu literature— they sought to establish the Pods as Kshatriyas and remove the stigma of untouchability. In what was a self-respect movement, it was demanded that all Pods follow Kshatriya rituals. 

In 1901, Halder organized a pan-Bengal conference of the Pods, wherein it was resolved to have the government rename the caste as "Poundra". Further mobilization happened under the leadership of Raicharan Sardar, a lawyer and first graduate from this community.

Status 
Today the Poundra are still highly abused for their caste, although they are dominant in southern Bengal especially in South 24 Parganas. In urban areas they were dominant in Canning Town, Kolkata, at the beginning of the 1940s, one of the few Dalit-dominant areas of the city. Today they, along with other Scheduled Castes, form only 13% of the urban population. Thus they are vulnerable to casteism in higher education and in daily life in urban areas as well as rural areas.

References

Scheduled Castes
Social groups of Odisha
Scheduled Castes of West Bengal